The 1952 Chico State Wildcats football team represented Chico State College—now known as California State University, Chico—as a member of the Far Western Conference (FWC) during the 1952 college football season. Led by first-year head coach Ernie Busch, Chico State compiled an overall record of 1–6 with a mark of 1–3 in conference play, placing fourth in the FWC. The team was outscored by its opponents 201 to 85 for the season. The Wildcats played home games at Chico High School Stadium in Chico, California.

Schedule

Notes

References

Chico State
Chico State Wildcats football seasons
Chico State Wildcats football